Setec is the fifth largest French engineering and consulting group, involved in infrastructure and transport systems, planning, economics, waste, project, telecommunication, water, energy, geotechnical and environmental management. Setec was created in 1957 as an acronym of the French Société d'Études Techniques et ÉConomiques, which means "technical and economical design company".

Its headquarters are located in Paris, near the Seine. From the 1960s, the company began to organise into different subsidiaries and to develop its international business. In 2012, it acquired the American MWH's Brazilian subsidiary. This new company is called setec hidrobrasileira.

Key figures

Main projets
The main projects that setec contributed are for example :
 the Channel Tunnel,
 the Millau Viaduct,
 the LGV Rhin-Rhône and LGV Est
 the Peking opera,
 the Cœur Défense skyscraper,
 the Macau Light Rail Transit
 the Fondation Louis Vuitton pour la création
and many others infrastructures and buildings.

Notes and references

Engineering companies of France
Companies based in Paris
Technology companies established in 1957